Iberoformica is a small genus of ants in the subfamily Formicinae.

Taxonomy
The genus was first described as a subgenus of Formica by Tinaut (1990), when he reclassified Formica subrufa as Iberoformica subrufa, the type species of the new subgenus. Agosti (1994) synonymized the subgenus with Formica, and the taxon was finally revived and elevated to genus rank by Muñoz-López et al. (2012) based on molecular data.

Species
 Iberoformica subrufa (Roger, 1859)

References

Formicinae
Ant genera